Dmitri Vladislavovich Shoukov (born 26 September 1975) is a Russian football coach and a former player. He is the manager of the Under-19 squad of PFC Krylia Sovetov Samara. His position on the field was right winger, he could also play as a forward. He also holds Dutch citizenship.

Playing career
Shoukov began his career in 1993 at PFC CSKA Moscow.  In 1995, he made change to go play in the Netherlands for Vitesse Arnhem.  After one season he went to play for NAC then he moved to Willem II in 1999. On 20 January 2004 he came to play for FC Twente. He retired in January 2007.

Honours
 Russian Cup finalist: 1994.

European club competitions
 UEFA Cup Winners' Cup 1994–95 with PFC CSKA Moscow: 2 games.
 UEFA Cup 1998–99 with Vitesse: 1 game.
 UEFA Champions League 1999–2000 with Willem II Tilburg: 5 games, 1 goal.
 UEFA Cup 2006–07 with FC Twente: 1 game.

Trivia
 In an interview with the TC Tubantia Shoukov declared that he is possibly wanted by FC Twente as a scout.

External links
  

1975 births
Living people
Russian footballers
Russia under-21 international footballers
PFC CSKA Moscow players
SBV Vitesse players
NAC Breda players
Willem II (football club) players
FC Twente players
Russian Premier League players
Eredivisie players
Russian expatriate footballers
Expatriate footballers in the Netherlands
Sportspeople from Samara, Russia
Association football midfielders
Russian football managers